Lawkananda Pagoda (also spelt Lokananda, literally "joy of the world") is a Buddhist stupa located in Bagan, Burma (formerly Pagan). It was erected on the bank of the Ayeyarwaddy River, and built during the reign of King Anawrahta. It contains a replica of a Buddha tooth relic.
The Lawkananda Pagoda festival along with local foodand handicrafts is celebrated in the month of July every year. Since it takes place in the rainy season, very few outside visitors are able to attend the festival.
On 24 May 2003, a bejewelled umbrella (hti) was hoisted to the top of the pagoda.

See also
Cetiya
Burmese pagoda
Bupaya Pagoda
Dhammayazika Pagoda
Mingalazedi Pagoda
Shwesandaw Pagoda (Bagan)
Shwezigon Pagoda
Relic of the tooth of the Buddha

References

Pagodas in Myanmar
Bagan